Langford is an unincorporated community in Rankin County, Mississippi, United States.
Langford is served by the Langford Volunteer Fire Department as part of the Rankin County Fire District system.

References

Unincorporated communities in Rankin County, Mississippi
Unincorporated communities in Mississippi